Mason & Associates is a privately held advertising agency in Sydney, Australia.  The company has worked on projects for Astron Ltd and G-Star Raw.

The company, originally named Toshiedo, was founded in Sydney by James Mason. In 2014 he changed its trading name to Mason & Associates.

:Mason & Associates 

Company no longer exists

Awards
Toshiedo's creative work has been recognized by numerous industry honors including the American Design Award in 2007, 2009.
Toshiedo has also featured in the 'Web Design Index 8' by Pepin Press and Dot Net Magazine

References

External links
Official Website
Zinruss Website
Advertising Agency

Privately held companies of Australia
Advertising agencies of Australia
Mass media companies of Australia
Companies based in Sydney